Oussama Tannane (born 23 March 1994) is a Moroccan professional footballer who plays as a winger for Dutch club NEC. A youth international for the Netherlands, he represents the Morocco national team.

Club career

Heerenveen
Tannane made his Eredivisie league debut for SC Heerenveen during the 2012–13 season. At the end of the season, he was released and signed with Heracles Almelo.

Heracles Almelo
On 22 August 2015, Tannane scored four goals in one half during Heracles' 6–1 win away to SC Cambuur-Leeuwarden.

Saint-Étienne
Tannane signed with Ligue 1 side AS Saint-Étienne in January 2016. In his first game with Saint-Étienne, he scored and gave assists twice, contributing greatly to his club's 4–1 victory against Ligue 1 club Bordeaux.

Las Palmas (loan)
On 1 September 2017, Tannane joined La Liga club UD Las Palmas on a season-long loan deal, which includes a buyout option. He returned after only two months, later claiming he did not know that Las Palmas is located on an island and that he should never have joined them.

Utrecht (loan)
In August 2018, Tannane again left Saint-Étienne on loan, joining Eredivisie side FC Utrecht.

Vitesse
On 12 July 2019, Tannane signed a three-year contract at Eredivisie side Vitesse. He made his debut for his new club in Vitesse's first game of the 2019–20 Eredivisie season, a 2–2 draw with Ajax. On 29 September 2019, Tannane scored his first goal for Vitesse, a late game-winning penalty in a 1–2 away victory against Eredivisie strugglers RKC Waalwijk.

Tannane started the 2020–21 season in fine form, scoring a long-range free kick in a 2–0 win against Sparta Rotterdam in Vitesse's first home game of the campaign. On 18 October 2020, Tannane was sent off by referee Richard Martens in the first half of an Eredivisie match against ADO Den Haag, after receiving two yellow cards in quick succession for dissent. In his first match back after suspension, Tannane netted a brace in a 3–1 win against Emmen to keep Vitesse level on points with Ajax at the summit of the Eredivisie table.

In January 2022 it was announced Vitesse terminated his contract.

Göztepe
On 8 January 2022, Tannane signed with Göztepe in Turkey.

NEC
On 21 June 2022, Tannane returned to the Netherlands and signed a two-year contract with former club Vitesse's local rivals NEC. Four minutes into his debut and first game back in the Eredivisie, Tannane let fly from the halfway line, beating the outstretched hands of Twente keeper Lars Unnerstall but narrowly missing the goal, instantly winning him over to the NEC faithful.

International career
Tannane was born in Morocco, but moved to Netherlands at a young age. He represented the Netherlands U21s. In March 2016, he was called up to the Morocco national football team for 2017 Africa Cup of Nations qualification matches against Cape Verde, and made his debut on 26 March in a 1–0 win.

Career statistics

Club

International

International goals

References

External links
 Voetbal International profile 
 Netherlands profile at Ons Oranje

1994 births
Living people
People from Tétouan
Association football midfielders
Moroccan footballers
Morocco international footballers
Dutch footballers
Netherlands under-21 international footballers
Eredivisie players
Ligue 1 players
La Liga players
Süper Lig players
SC Heerenveen players
Heracles Almelo players
AS Saint-Étienne players
UD Las Palmas players
FC Utrecht players
SBV Vitesse players
Göztepe S.K. footballers
NEC Nijmegen players
Moroccan emigrants to the Netherlands
Moroccan expatriate footballers
Expatriate footballers in France
Moroccan expatriate sportspeople in France
Expatriate footballers in Spain
Moroccan expatriate sportspeople in Spain
Expatriate footballers in Turkey
Moroccan expatriate sportspeople in Turkey